Gåsevadholm Castle is a castle on an island in the Rolfsån river in Halland, Sweden. Sir John Maclean, 1st Baronet was the Lord of Gåsevadholm.

See also
List of castles in Sweden

References

Castles in Halland County